Centennial Fountain is a fountain at the Seattle University campus by George Tsutakawa, in Seattle, Washington. The fountain was installed in 1989.

See also
 1989 in art

References

External links

 

1989 establishments in Washington (state)
1989 sculptures
Fountains in Washington (state)
Outdoor sculptures in Seattle
Seattle University campus